Allagnon may refer to:

 Alagnon, French river
 Stéphane Allagnon, French director